

Records

Scores

Highest Lancashire totals

Highest totals against each county

Lowest Lancashire totals

Lowest totals against Lancashire

Results

Tied matches

Largest margin of innings victory

Largest margin of runs victory

Narrowest margin of runs victory

Victory after following on

Defeat after opponents followed on

Partnership record for each wicket

Player records

Batting

Bowling

Wicket-keeping

Most first-class runs for Lancashire 
Qualification – 20000 runs

Most first-class wickets for Lancashire 
Qualification – 1000 wickets

Facts and feats
Dick Barlow carried his bat for just 5* out of Lancashire's total of 69 in two and a half hours against Nottinghamshire on a treacherous, rain-affected Trent Bridge pitch in July 1882. Barlow and his longtime opening partner Hornby are the opening batsmen immortalised in the famous poem by Francis Thompson.
Eddie Paynter scored 322 in five hours for Lancashire against Sussex CCC at Hove in 1937 having come down on the sleeper train from the victorious Old Trafford Test against New Zealand. He put on 268 in 155 minutes with Cyril Washbrook and celebrated his innings that evening at Brighton's Ice Palace.
Lancashire County Cricket Club came runners-up in all four competitions in three seasons from 2004 to 2006 without winning one. In 2004, they came runners-up to Glamorgan in the Totesport League. In 2005, they came runners-up to Somerset in the Twenty20 Cup. In 2006, they came runners-up to Sussex in both the Liverpool Victoria County Championship and the Cheltenham and Gloucester Trophy.

References

Lancashire County Cricket Club
Lancashire County Cricket Club Records